Willem Mons (1688 in Russia – 1724) was the brother of Peter the Great's long-time mistress Anna Mons, who later served as private secretary to Peter's wife Catherine.

After his sister's fall from favour, Willem joined the Russian army and took part in the Battle of Poltava. In 1711, he was appointed personal adjutant to the tsar. His other sister Matryona Balk had in the meantime become the closest friend of Catherine, whom Peter married in 1712.

In 1716, at Catherine's behest, Peter entrusted Willem with administering her estates. After Catherine's coronation as consort in 1724, he was promoted to the rank of imperial chamberlain. A few months later, however, Willem Mons was arrested on charges of peculation (embezzlement) and breach of trust and, after a brief and brutal inquiry by Pyotr Tolstoy, he was publicly beheaded on November 27. His head was preserved in alcohol and was supposedly kept temporarily in the Kunstkamera. There is a legend that Peter forced his wife to contemplate this gruesome exhibit for hours.

The true causes of Willem's downfall are obscure. It was rumoured that Peter was enraged by his intimacy with the Empress. Many courtiers regarded Mons as Catherine's lover and his sister Matryona as their matchmaker. The affair did not affect Catherine's position as empress, however.

Just months after his execution, Catherine succeeded to the throne and lavished honours on Matryona (who had been publicly flogged during her brother's trial) and her Lutheran daughter, Natalia Lopukhina, who would later give her name to the Lopukhina Conspiracy (1742–43).

References

Literature 
 Семевский М. И. Очерки и рассказы из русской истории XVIII века. Царица Катерина Алексеевна, Анна и Виллим Монс. Спб., 1883—1884.

Politicians of the Russian Empire
Dutch nobility
1688 births
1724 deaths
Executed Dutch people
People executed by Russia by decapitation
18th-century executions by Russia
Male lovers of Russian royalty
People executed for corruption